see also: 1910s in games, 1930s in games

Games released or invented in the 1920s
Escalado (1928 or 1929?)

Significant games-related events in the 1920s
Henry and Helal Hassenfeld found the Hassenfeld Brothers company (1923), later shortened to the name Hasbro (1968).  

Games
Games by decade